Saint-Laurent (formerly Saint-Laurent—Cartierville) is a federal electoral district in Quebec, Canada, that has been represented in the House of Commons of Canada since 1988.

Geography
The district corresponds exactly to the borough of Saint-Laurent in the city of Montreal.

The neighbouring ridings are Ahuntsic-Cartierville, Dorval—Lachine—LaSalle, Mount Royal and Pierrefonds—Dollard.

Demographics
According to the Canada 2021 Census

Ethnic groups: 40.9% White, 18.6% Arab, 10.1% Black, 8.6% South Asian, 8.2% Chinese, 3.8% Southeast Asian, 3.2% Latin American, 2% Filipino, 1.5% West Asian
Languages: 25.5% French, 15.2% Arabic, 14.4% English, 3.6% Mandarin, 3.2% Spanish, 2.9% Yue, 2.7% Greek, 1.8% Vietnamese, 1.6% Armenian, 1.5% Tamil, 1.5% Italian, 1.2% Punjabi, 1% Urdu
Religions: 44.9% Christian (23.6% Catholic, 9.1% Christian Orthodox, 1% Pentecostal), 22.4% Muslim, 18.4% No Religion, 5.5% Jewish, 3.8% Hindu, 3.4% Buddhist, 1% Sikh 
Median income: $32,200 (2020) 
Average income: $50,320 (2020)

History
The electoral district of Saint-Laurent was created in 1987 from Dollard, Laval-des-Rapides and Saint-Denis. The name was changed to Saint-Laurent—Cartierville in 1989.

This riding lost territory to Ahuntsic-Cartierville during the 2012 electoral redistribution.

It was represented since a by-election in 2017 by Emmanuella Lambropoulos, member of the Liberal Party. It has long been regarded as one of the safest Liberal ridings in the nation.

Members of Parliament

This riding has elected the following Members of Parliament:

Election results

Saint-Laurent, 2015–present

Saint-Laurent—Cartierville, 1993–2015

	

Note: Conservative vote is compared to the total of the Canadian Alliance vote and Progressive Conservative vote in 2000 election.

Saint-Laurent, 1988–1993

See also
 List of Canadian federal electoral districts
 Past Canadian electoral districts

References

Campaign expense data from Elections Canada
Riding history from the Library of Parliament
Saint-Laurent
Saint-Laurent—Cartierville
2011 Results from Elections Canada

Notes

Federal electoral districts of Montreal
Saint-Laurent, Quebec